The Apostate is the eighth studio album by Art Bergmann, released in 2016 on weewerk records. It is his first new full-length album since 1998's Design Flaw.  The digital release date was April 8, 2016 and the CD / LP release date was May 13, 2016.

The album was funded in part by a crowdfunding campaign on PledgeMusic. Musician Craig Northey also publicized the campaign by releasing a cover of Bergmann's 1991 single "Faithlessly Yours".

Track listing

Personnel
Art Bergmann – electric and acoustic guitars, vocals
Paul Rigby – steel, acoustic, baritone and electric guitars, mandolin, e-bow
Lorrie Matheson – acoustic and electric guitars, mellotron, organ, pianorgan, chopsticks
Jason Sniderman –  piano, wurlitzer, mellotron
Ian Grant – drums, percussion
Peter Clarke – bass
Foon Yap – violin
Mike Little – accordion
Natasha Sayer – vocals
Emily Triggs – vocals
Nikki Valentine – vocals

References

2016 albums
Art Bergmann albums